Mark Swed (born ) is an American music critic who specializes in classical music. Since 1996 he has been the chief classical music critic of the Los Angeles Times where his writings have made him a two-time finalist for the Pulitzer Prize for Criticism. Prior to his LA Times post, Swed was the chief music critic for the Los Angeles Herald Examiner and The Wall Street Journal, and has contributed other writings to a variety of publications including The Orchestra, an iPad application. He has a particular interest in contemporary classical music.

Life and career
Mark Swed was born  and attended the University of California, Berkeley, receiving a Bachelor of Arts in music, and Mills College, receiving a Master of Arts. He was chief music critic at numerous newspapers, including the Los Angeles Herald Examiner, The Wall Street Journal and 7 Days. In addition, he has written other music criticism for a variety of publications, including BBC Music, Gramophone, Musical America, Opera News, Schwann-Opus, Stagebill, The Economist, The New York Times and The New Yorker. Interested in contemporary classical music early on, Swed edited the 20th-century classical music section of The Musical Quarterly from 1992 to 2000. He wrote substantial commentary—described by Grove Music Online as a "book-length text"—for The Orchestra, a well-received iPad application that featured Esa-Pekka Salonen and the Philharmonia Orchestra with autoscrolling and interactive sheet music to numerous orchestral works. He often makes appearances on KCRW, an NPR radio station of Santa Monica College. Since 1996, he has been the chief classical music critic of the Los Angeles Times, succeeding Martin Bernheimer. Swed is currently engaged in writing a biography of the American composer John Cage.

The recipient of numerous awards, Swed received the 1994 ASCAP Deems Taylor Award, as well as a Letter of Distinction from the American Music Center. The Los Angeles Music Center and the Los Angeles Press Club have also recognized his work. He has been a finalist for the Pulitzer Prize for Criticism twice, in 2007 and 2021. The 2007 nomination is described as being "For his passionate music criticism, marked by resonant writing and an ability to give life to the people behind a performance". For his 2021 nomination, the nomination was "for a series of critical essays that broke through the silence of the pandemic to recommend an eclectic array of recordings as entertainment and solace essential to the moment, drawing deep connections to seven centuries of classical music". He is a fellow at The Los Angeles Institute for the Humanities at the USC Dornsife College of Letters, Arts and Sciences of the University of Southern California.

Selected publications

Articles

References

External links
 Articles by Mark Swed in the Los Angeles Times
 

1945 births
Living people
American music critics
Classical music critics
Los Angeles Times people
University of California, Berkeley alumni